Baylor University Medical Center station is a DART light rail station located near Baylor University Medical Center in Dallas, Texas on the .  The station opened on September 14, 2009 as one of four original stops on the line.

References

External links 
Dallas Area Rapid Transit - Baylor University Medical Center Station

Dallas Area Rapid Transit light rail stations in Dallas
Railway stations in the United States opened in 2009
2009 establishments in Texas
Railway stations in Dallas County, Texas